Richard Nathan may refer to:

Richard M. Nathan, Indian cinematographer
Richard P. Nathan, American academic
Richard Kwesi Nathan, Ghanaian footballer

See also
Rich Nathan, American pastor and author